Norman Wells Water Aerodrome  is located  south-southeast of Norman Wells, Northwest Territories, Canada on D.O.T. Lake. It is open from June until September.

See also
 Norman Wells Airport

References

Registered aerodromes in the Sahtu Region
Seaplane bases in the Northwest Territories